The Long Island serial killer (also referred to as LISK, the Gilgo Beach Killer, the Manorville Butcher, and the Craigslist Ripper) is an unidentified suspected serial killer who is believed to have murdered between 10 and 18 people over a period of nearly 20 years, and to have disposed of their bodies in areas on the South Shore of Long Island, New York. Most of the known victims were sex workers who advertised on Craigslist.

The victims' remains were found over a period of months in 2010 and 2011, after the disappearance of Shannan Gilbert resulted in a police search of the area along the Ocean Parkway, near the remote beach towns of Gilgo and Oak Beach in Suffolk County. The remains of four victims designated "The Gilgo Four" were found within a quarter of a mile of each other near Gilgo Beach in December 2010. Six more sets of remains were found in March and April 2011 in Suffolk and Nassau counties. Police believe the latter sets of remains predate the four bodies found in December 2010.

Gilbert's remains were found a year after the remains of "The Gilgo Four" were discovered. Her cause of death remains contested, with police claiming accidental drowning while an independent autopsy determined possible strangulation.

Police investigations
The first discovery of human remains was made by the side of Ocean Parkway in Oak Beach on December 11, 2010. The investigation was prompted by the search for Shannan Gilbert, a 24-year-old sex worker who had disappeared in the area in May that year after fleeing from a client's home and making a 23-minute-long emergency call to 911, saying, "They are trying to kill me." A month after her disappearance, the Suffolk County Police Department's missing persons bureau asked Officer John Mallia to search for Gilbert with his trained cadaver dog, a German Shepherd named Blue. Over the course of summer 2010, Mallia unsuccessfully searched the gated beach community where Gilbert had last been seen. The officer made a new attempt at a search on December 11, 2010, staying close to the shoulder of the parkway. Mallia based his choice of search area on FBI data indicating that dumped bodies are frequently found close to roadways. Despite thick vegetation and a light layer of snow, Mallia's cadaver dog alerted to a scent which the pair tracked to a skeleton in a disintegrating burlap bag. The remains were later identified as Melissa Barthelemy's. Police discovered three additional bodies while searching the scene for further evidence.

In March 2011, partial remains of Jessica Taylor were found along Ocean Parkway; eight years earlier, in 2003, other parts of Taylor's remains had been found in Manorville, a town in Suffolk County. The next month, in April 2011, police discovered three additional sets of remains:  an unidentified female toddler, an unidentified Asian person, and Valerie Mack, partial remains of whom – like those of Jessica Taylor – had been found in Manorville years earlier in November, 2000. Two more bodies were found in Nassau County; an unidentified woman whose partial remains had previously been found on Fire Island in 1996, and an unidentified woman with a distinctive tattoo of peaches who was later found to be the mother of the unidentified toddler found in Suffolk County.

On May 9, 2011, police speculated that because of similarities in the cases, Valerie Mack (who at the time was unidentified) and Jessica Taylor may have been murdered by a second, separate killer. On November 29, 2011, however, police announced that they believed one person to be responsible for all ten murders, and that the perpetrator is almost certainly from Long Island. The single killer theory stems from common characteristics between the condition of the remains and forensic evidence related to the bodies.

In June 2011, Suffolk County police announced a $25,000 reward for information leading to an arrest in the Long Island murders. Shannan Gilbert's remains were finally located in Oak Beach in December 2011, 19 months after her disappearance. The cause of her death is contested. As of 2020, all of the murders remain unsolved.

FBI involvement
On December 10, 2015, Suffolk County Police Commissioner Tim Sini announced that the FBI had officially joined the investigation. The announcement came one day after former police chief James Burke was indicted for civil rights violations and conspiracy. Burke, who resigned from the department in October 2015, was reported to have blocked FBI involvement in the LISK cases for years. The FBI had previously assisted in the search for victims but had never officially been a part of the investigation. In November 2016, Burke was sentenced to 46 months in federal prison for assault and conspiracy.

Bittrolff named as suspect
On September 12, 2017, Suffolk County prosecutor Robert Biancavilla from the county district attorney's office announced that John Bittrolff, a carpenter from Manorville, Long Island, was a suspect in at least one of the LISK murders. Bittroff had been convicted in May of that year of the murders of two sex workers in 1993 and 1994.

2020 release of evidence to the public
On January 16, 2020, Suffolk County Police Commissioner Geraldine Hart released images of a belt found at the crime scene with the letters "HM" or "WH" (depending on the orientation of the belt) embossed in black leather. The belt had been found during the initial investigation near Ocean Parkway in Gilgo Beach. Police believe that the belt was handled by the perpetrator and that it had not belonged to any of the victims. The police revealed few details about the belt's evidentiary value and would not comment on exactly where it had been found. It was also announced that new scientific evidence was being used in the investigation and that they had launched Gilgonews.com, a website enabling the department to share news and receive tips regarding the investigation.

Identification of Valerie Mack through genetic genealogy
In June 2019, a proposal was made to use genetic genealogy to identify the unidentified victims and possibly the killer in the LISK case. On May 28, 2020, "Jane Doe No. 6" was identified as Valerie Mack, who also went by the name of Melissa Taylor.

Victims discovered in December 2010

The Gilgo Four

Maureen Brainard-Barnes
Brainard-Barnes of Norwich, Connecticut, was 25 when she disappeared. She was last seen on July 9, 2007, saying that she planned "to spend the day in New York City." She was never seen again. Brainard-Barnes, a mother of two, worked as a paid escort via Craigslist to pay the mortgage on her house. She had been out of the sex industry for seven months but she returned to the work in order to pay her bills after receiving an eviction notice. Her body was found in December 2010. Shortly after her disappearance a friend of Brainard-Barnes's, Sara Karnes, received a phone call from a man on an unfamiliar number. The man claimed that he had just seen Brainard-Barnes and that she was alive and staying at a "whorehouse in Queens." He refused to identify himself and could not tell Karnes the location of the house. He told Karnes he would call back and give her the address, but never called again. Karnes said that the man had no discernible New York or Boston accent.

At the time of her disappearance, she was working at a Super 8 motel in Manhattan. On the night of July 9, 2007 she called a friend in Connecticut and told her that she was planning on meeting a client outside of the motel. She had been strangled.

Melissa Barthelemy
Barthelemy, 24, of Erie County, New York, went missing on July 12, 2009. She had been living in the Bronx in New York and working as an escort through Craigslist. On the night she went missing she met with a client, deposited $900 in her bank account, and attempted to call an old boyfriend, but did not get through. Beginning one week later, and lasting for five weeks, her teenage sister Amanda received a series of "vulgar, mocking, and insulting" calls from a man who may have been the killer using Melissa Barthelemy's cell phone. The caller asked if Amanda "was a whore like her sister." The calls became increasingly disturbing and eventually culminated in the caller telling Amanda that her sister was dead and that he was going to "watch her rot." Police traced some of the calls to Madison Square Garden, midtown Manhattan, and Massapequa, but were unable to determine who was making them. Barthelemy's mother noted that there were "a lot of calls to Manorville" from her daughter's phone around the time of her disappearance. In September 2017 John Bittrolff, a carpenter from that town convicted of two other murders, was named as a suspect in the LISK cases. She had been strangled.

Megan Waterman
Waterman, 22, of South Portland, Maine, went missing on June 6, 2010 after placing advertisements on Craigslist as an escort. The previous day she had told her 20-year-old boyfriend that she was going out and would call him later. At the time of her disappearance she was staying at a motel in Hauppauge, New York, 15 miles northeast of Gilgo Beach. Her body was recovered in December 2010. Waterman was a mother of one and had become a victim of sex trafficking. She had been strangled.

Amber Lynn Costello
Costello, 27, of West Babylon, New York, a town ten miles north of Gilgo Beach, was a sex worker and heroin user who went missing on September 2, 2010. That night she reportedly went to meet a stranger who had called her several times and offered $1,500 for her services. Born in Charlotte and raised in Wilmington, North Carolina, Costello was living in West Babylon, New York when she disappeared. Her family believed that she was in a residential drug rehabilitation center and so she was not immediately reported missing when she stopped responding to messages and phone calls. Prior to moving to West Babylon, Costello had been living with her second husband in Clearwater, Florida and was working as a waitress. A strong student, Costello's drug addiction began when she was a teenager. She had been sexually assaulted by a neighbor when she was 6-years-old. She had been strangled.

Victims discovered in March and April 2011
Four more sets of remains were discovered on March 29 and April 4, 2011. All of the remains were found in another area off the parkway near Oak Beach and Gilgo Beach, within two miles and to the east of those found in December 2010. The newly-discovered victims were Jessica Taylor, Valerie Mack, an unidentified woman designated "Jane Doe No. 3" or "Peaches", and an unidentified toddler who was the daughter of "Peaches". Suffolk Police subsequently expanded the search area up to the Nassau County border looking for more victims.

Two further sets of remains were discovered on April 11, 2011 after the search expanded into Nassau County. They were found about one mile apart, approximately five miles west of those found in December. One set of remains belonged to a victim now thought to be a transgender woman. Designated "Asian Male," police said that the victim had been dead for between five and ten years. The other remains were those of "Jane Doe No. 7" whose partial remains had been discovered on Fire Island in 1996.

Identified

Valerie Mack / Melissa Taylor / "Manorville Jane Doe" / "Jane Doe No. 6"
Valerie Mack, 24, also known as Melissa Taylor, was living in Philadelphia and working as an escort when she went missing in 2000.

Mack's partial remains were discovered in Manorville on November 19, 2000 but were not identified until 2020. Her torso was found wrapped in garbage bags and dumped in the woods near the intersection of Halsey Manor Road and Mill Road, adjacent to a set of power lines and a nearby power line access road.

A head, right foot, and hands found on April 4, 2011 were at first determined to have belonged to an unidentified victim, dubbed "Jane Doe No. 6"; it was later determined that they belonged to the same woman whose torso had been found in 2000. Her right foot had been cut off high above the ankle, possibly to conceal an identifying mark or tattoo. On May 28, 2020 police announced that the remains had been identified as Valerie Mack, who had last been seen by family members in the spring or summer of 2000 in the area of Port Republic, New Jersey. The dismembered remains of Valerie Mack and Jessica Taylor were both disposed of in a similar manner, and in the same part of Manorville, suggesting a link.

Jessica Taylor
Jessica Taylor was 20-years-old and living in Manhattan when she went missing on July 21, 2003. Taylor's torso was found atop a pile of scrap wood at the end of a paved access road off Halsey Manor Road, just north of where it crosses the Long Island Expressway. Plastic sheeting was found underneath the torso, and a tattoo on her body had been mutilated with a sharp instrument.

Further remains found on March 29, 2011 at Gilgo including the remains of a skull, a pair of hands, and a forearm that were matched to Taylor. She had worked in Washington, D.C. and Manhattan as a sex worker. Taylor was last seen working around the Port Authority Bus Terminal in Manhattan between July 18 and 22, 2003.

Unidentified
On September 20, 2011, police released composite sketches of two of the unidentified victims (dubbed "Asian male" and "Jane Doe No. 6") whose remains had been found in March and April 2011, as well as photos of jewelry found on the remains of a female toddler and her mother, "Jane Doe No. 3," found on April 4 and 11, respectively. One of the sets of remains found in Nassau County on April 11 was later identified as the mother of the toddler.

"Peaches" / "Jane Doe No. 3"

On April 11, 2011 police in Nassau County discovered dismembered skeletal human remains inside a plastic bag near Jones Beach State Park. The victim was dubbed "Jane Doe No. 3." DNA analysis later positively indicated that the remains belonged to a woman whose torso had been found in Hempstead Lake State Park fourteen years earlier. On June 28, 1997 the dismembered torso of an unidentified young African-American woman was found at Hempstead Lake State Park, in the town of Lakeview, New York. The torso was found in a green plastic Rubbermaid container, which was dumped next to a road along the west side of the lake. Investigators reported that the victim had a tattoo on her left breast of a heart-shaped peach with a bite out of it and two drips falling from its core.

In December 2016 "Peaches" and "Jane Doe No. 3" were positively identified as being the same person. DNA analysis also identified "Peaches" as the mother of "Baby Doe;" she was found wearing gold jewelry similar to that of her daughter.

"Baby Doe"
The body was wrapped in a blanket and showed no visible signs of trauma. The toddler was reported to be African-American and was wearing gold earrings and a gold necklace.

"John Doe" / "Asian male"
The body of a young Asian male who had died from blunt-force trauma was also discovered on April 4, 2011 at Gilgo Beach, very close to where the first four sets of remains had been discovered in December 2010. The victim was found wearing women's clothing. He was between 17 and 23 years of age,  in height, missing four teeth, and may have had a musculoskeletal disorder which would have affected his gait. He had been dead between five and 10 years. In September 2011, police released a composite sketch of the victim.

"Jane Doe No. 7" / "Fire Island Jane Doe"
A human skull and several teeth were recovered on April 11, 2011 at Tobay Beach. These remains were linked through DNA testing to a set of severed legs found in a garbage bag on Fire Island 15 years earlier on April 20, 1996.  Jane Doe No. 7's remains were the second set to be discovered in Nassau County on April 11, 2011. Jane Doe No. 7 had a surgical scar on her left leg.

Discovery of Shannan Gilbert's body
On December 13, 2011 police announced that the remains of Shannan Gilbert had been found in a marsh about half a mile from where she had disappeared. A week earlier some of her clothing and belongings had been discovered in the same vicinity. Gilbert was last seen banging on a resident's door and screaming for help before running off into the night. Gilbert made an emergency 9-1-1 call that night saying that she feared for her life.

Police have stated that the death of Gilbert, an escort whose disappearance triggered the search during which the first set of bodies was found, is not related to the Long Island serial killer case. Gilbert's now-deceased mother Mari Gilbert, however, strongly advocated for the theory that Shannan Gilbert had been murdered by a serial killer.

Timeline

1996 
 April 20, 1996: “Fire Island Jane Doe” / “Jane Doe No. 7”’s partial remains found on Fire Island

1997 
 June 28, 1997: “Peaches”/ “Jane Doe No.3”’s partial remains found at Hempstead Lake State Park

2000 
 Spring/summer 2000: Valerie Mack last seen by family members
 November 19, 2000: Valerie Mack’s partial remains found in Manorville

2003 
 July 2003: Jessica Taylor last seen
 July 26, 2003: Jessica Taylor’s partial remains are found in Manorville

2007 
 July 9, 2007: Maureen Brainard-Barnes last seen
 July 2007: A friend of Brainard-Barnes's, Sara Karnes, receives a phone call from a man claiming that he had just seen Brainard-Barnes and that she was alive and staying at a "whorehouse in Queens.”

2009 
 July 10, 2009: Melissa Barthelemy last seen
 July – August 2009: Amanda Barthelemy, sister of Melissa Barthelemy, receives a series of "vulgar, mocking and insulting" calls from a man using Melissa Barthelemy's cell phone. The caller eventually tells Amanda that her sister is dead.

2010 
 May 2, 2010: Shannan Gilbert makes a panicked phone call to 911 at 4:51am after fleeing a client’s house in Oak Beach. She bangs on the doors of several neighboring houses and disappears
 June 6, 2010: Megan Waterman last seen
 September 2, 2010: Amber Lynn Costello last seen
 December 11, 2010: Melissa Barthelemy’s remains are found.
 December 13, 2010: Megan Waterman, Amber Lynn Costello, and Maureen Brainard-Barnes’s remains are found.

2011 
 March 29, 2011: Jessica Taylor’s further partial remains found at Gilgo
 April 4, 2011: Valerie Mack’s further partial remains found
 April 4, 2011: “Baby Doe,” the 16-24-month-old daughter of “Peaches,” found
 April 4, 2011: "John Doe" / "Asian male" found
 April 11, 2011: "Peaches" / "Jane Doe No. 3"'s further partial remains found near Jones Beach State Park  
 April 11, 2011: “Fire Island Jane Doe / Jane Doe No. 7”’s further partial remains found at Tobay Beach
 December 13, 2011: Shannan Gilbert’s remains are found in a marsh at Oak Beach

2016 
 December 2016: "Peaches" and "Jane Doe No. 3" are positively identified as being the same person

2017 
 September 2017: John Bittrolff, a carpenter from Manorville convicted of the murders of two other prostitutes, is named as a suspect in the LISK cases. Biltroff had been convicted of murdering Rita Tangredi and Colleen McNamee, whose bodies were found in 1993 and 1994 respectively.

2020 
 May 28, 2020: Confirmation announced of forensic identification of formerly unidentified remains of Valerie Mack.

Other possible victims

Identified

Tina Elizabeth Foglia
19-year-old Tina Foglia was last seen alive in the early morning hours of February 1, 1982 at the Hammerheads rock music venue on Sunrise Highway, West Islip. She had hitchhiked from her home to the venue to see a friend performing with a Queens-based band Equinox. Her remains were discovered by Department of Transportation workers on February 3 on a shoulder of the Sagtikos State Parkway in Suffolk County. Her dismembered body, which had been placed in three separate plastic garbage bags, was found a few miles north of the Robert Moses Causeway, which leads to Gilgo Beach and Oak Beach.

A diamond ring that Foglia was known to wear was missing and the DNA of an unknown male was found on the garbage bags. Police have not ruled out the possibility that Tina Foglia was an early victim of the Long Island Serial Killer but have stated that a connection is "not an active avenue of the investigation."

Jacqueline Ashley Smith
Jacqueline Smith, 16, was last seen in Brooklyn, New York on August 7, 1999. She had left her home at 9 p.m. to visit friends and never came back. She was reported missing on August 12, 1999. On June 20, 2000 an unidentified female torso was recovered near Beach 88th Street in Rockaway Beach, Queens. The torso was found in plastic bags and wrapped with tape. No other body parts were recovered. The case was previously listed in the National Missing and Unidentified Persons System (NamUs) as case #UP6058. The victim was later identified as Jacqueline Smith. Two years later, the torso of Andre Isaac was also recovered in Rockaway not far from where Jacqueline was found.

Andre Jamal Isaac
Andre Isaac was a professional drag queen known by his stage name "Sugar Bear". He was 6'5" inches tall and was 25-years-old when he disappeared from East New York in November 2002. According to a friend, Isaac was last seen shortly before Thanksgiving, getting into a car with a "secret friend." The vehicle was described as a red BMW-type coupe driven by a Hispanic man. Isaac's torso was found close to the boardwalk on Beach 63 Street in Arverne, Queens on December 17, 2002. On January 25, 2003 his head was discovered by ice skaters in East Millpond in Moriches, New York in Suffolk County, with a single bullet wound to a temple. His arms and legs were later found several miles away in plastic bags. Isaac's case was added to the Suffolk County Police Department Gilgo News website on May 29, 2020.

Jamie Diane Seymour
Jamie Seymour, a 21-year-old escort and drug user, was last seen in Brick, New Jersey, on July 22, 2005. She called her father on July 22 to let him know she was on her way to the Port Authority area to meet a client. Seymour used someone else's phone at the Manhattan Port Authority to call her mother later that day. She has not been seen or heard from since.

After the final phone call to her mother – when two weeks passed and no one heard from Jamie – the family became worried. On August 8, her father reported her missing to police. Jamie spent a lot of time prior to her disappearance in New York City and had a criminal record. There have been few leads in Jamie’s case and her sister believes that she met with foul play. While police have never indicated any connection between Jamie’s disappearance and the Long Island serial killer it is worth noting that there some similarities  with LISK's modus operandi.

Jamie was a young woman with a small frame, like almost every victim of the Long Island serial killer. She was between 115 and 135 pounds and five feet, six inches tall. She vanished in July, along with victims Melissa Barthelemy, Maureen Brainard Barnes, and Jessica Taylor. Jamie actually vanished at the same place, the Port Authority bus station in midtown Manhattan, almost precisely two years to the day after Jessica Taylor vanished.

Tanya Rush
On June 23, 2008 Tanya Rush, 39, was last seen around 3 a.m. walking towards a subway station in Brooklyn. Her dismembered body was found by a state road-cleaning crew inside a black canvas suitcase on June 27, 2008 in plain sight on the Newbridge Road ramp leading to the westbound Southern State Parkway in Bellmore, New York. Rush was a mother of three who had been a Salvation Army volunteer and had worked in telemarketing. She took up sex work to support a drug addiction. Rush was African-American and lived in the Van Dyke Houses, a Brownsville public housing complex in Brooklyn, New York.

Shannan Maria Gilbert
24-year-old Shannan Maria Gilbert was an escort who may have been a victim of the Long Island serial killer. She left for a client's residence in Oak Beach after midnight on May 1, 2010. At 4:51 in the morning 911 dispatchers received a panicked phone call from Gilbert who can be heard saying that there was someone "after her" and that "they" were trying to kill her. She was last seen a short time later banging on the front door of a nearby Oak Beach residence and screaming for help before running off into the night. After nineteen months of searching police found Gilbert's remains in a marsh, half a mile from where she was last seen. In May 2012 the Suffolk County medical examiners ruled that Gilbert accidentally drowned after entering the marsh. They believe that she was in a drug induced panic and have concluded that hers was "death by misadventure" or "inconclusive." Her family believes she was murdered. On November 15, 2012 a lawsuit was filed by her mother, Mari Gilbert, against the Suffolk County Police Department in the hopes of getting more answers about what happened to her daughter the night she went missing. Due to the controversy about Gilbert's death, in September 2014, famed forensic pathologist Dr. Michael Baden agreed to conduct an independent autopsy of Gilbert's remains in hopes of determining a clear cause of death. Upon examination of Gilbert's remains Baden found damage to her hyoid bone suggesting that strangulation may have occurred. Baden also noted that her body was found face-up, which is not common for drowning victims. Despite this, her death is still officially listed by police as an accident.

On July 23, 2016 Mari Gilbert was murdered in her home in Ellenville, New York. Later that day her younger daughter, Sarra Elizabeth Gilbert, was arrested and charged with the stabbing death of her mother. On May 6, 2020 the New York State Supreme Court ordered Suffolk County Police to release Gilbert's 911 call recording, denying their request to withhold it after more than 10 years.  The tapes were released to Gilbert's estate attorney, John Ray, a short time later. Under the court order Ray is barred from discussing the specifics of the call. He did, however, comment that the nature of the calls contradict what Suffolk Police Detective Vincent Stephan had described in earlier reports about the calls from that morning. Specifically, Gilbert's tone had been described by Detective Stephan as calm and indicated no desperation. After reviewing the tapes Ray claimed that this was not true. On May 13, 2022 the Suffolk County Police Department released the 911 call.

Unidentified

"Cherries" / Unidentified woman, Mamaroneck
On March 3, 2007 a suitcase containing the dismembered torso of an unidentified Hispanic or light-skinned African-American woman washed up on a beach at Harbor Island Park in the town of Mamaroneck. The victim had a tattoo of two cherries on her left breast, similar in appearance to the tattoo found on "Peaches." She was determined to have been stabbed to death. Never identified, the victim is referred to as "Cherries" by investigators. One of her dismembered legs washed up at Cold Spring Harbor on March 21, 2007 and the other at Oyster Bay in the village of Cove Neck the following day. "Cherries" was dismembered in a fashion similar to three other victims (Jessica Taylor, Valerie Mack, and "Peaches") meaning she may be linked to the other official victims.

Unidentified woman, Lattingtown
On January 23, 2013 a woman walking her dog found human remains in a small patch of brush in a sandy area along the shore at the end of Sheep Lane in Lattingtown, near Oyster Bay. The skeletal remains showed signs of trauma and were wrapped in a particular type of material that police have not disclosed. The remains are believed to be those of a woman between the ages of 20 and 30 who was possibly Asian. She was wearing a 22-karat solid gold pig pendant which may be related to the Chinese zodiac "Year of the Pig." The relevant birth years are 1971, 1983, and 1995, possibly suggesting that the woman died at the age of 29. Investigators believe that her body had been dumped before Hurricane Sandy in late 2012.

Identity of the killer
The media has speculated about a profile of the killer, referred to by police as "Joe C" (unknown subject). According to the New York Times, the perpetrator is most likely a white male who would have been in his mid-twenties to mid-forties and who is very familiar with the South Shore of Long Island. He had access to burlap sacks, which he used to hold the bodies for disposal. He may have a detailed knowledge of law enforcement techniques, and perhaps ties to law enforcement, which have thus far helped him avoid detection.

Newsday reporters speculated that serial killer Joel Rifkin, a former resident on Long Island, may have been responsible for some of the older remains found in March and April 2011. Four of the victims' complete bodies have never been found. In an April 2011 prison interview with Newsday, Rifkin denied having anything to do with recently discovered remains.

Suspects and persons of interest

John Bittrolff 
On September 12, 2017 Suffolk County prosecutor Robert Biancavilla said that John Bittrolff, a Suffolk county resident convicted of murdering two prostitutes and suspected in the murder of a third, was a suspect in at least one of the LISK murders. Biancavilla stated that Bittrolff was likely responsible for the deaths of other women, and that there were similarities between the Gilgo Beach crime scenes and Bittrolff's known murders, for which he was convicted in May 2017 and sentenced in September.

Bittrolff was arrested in 2014 after his DNA was found on two murdered women, Rita Tangredi and Colleen McNamee, whose bodies were found in 1993 and 1994, respectively. The match had been made through DNA submitted by his brother, who was convicted in 2013 in an unrelated case. Bittrolff was convicted in May 2017 of these murders, and in September sentenced to consecutive terms of 25 years for each murder. The Suffolk County police did not comment on the prosecutor's statement due to the active homicide investigation of the LISK murders. Bittrolff's attorney rejected the prosecutor's assertion.

Bittrolff lived in Manorville, three miles from where the torsos of LISK victims Jessica Taylor and Valerie Mack were recovered. Bittrolff was a hunter who was said to enjoy killing animals. He was a carpenter by trade with access to hacksaws and electric saws. Because many of the bodies were found precisely dismembered his access to and proficiency with these tools is of note.

The grown daughter of Rita Tangredi, who was murdered by Bittrolff, was also the best friend of Melissa Barthelemy, who was one of the Gilgo Beach victims. Barthelemy's mother said that her daughter Melissa "had a lot of calls to Manorville from her phone" before her death.

Joseph Brewer 
Joseph Brewer, an Oak Beach resident, was one of the last people known to have seen Shannan Gilbert alive. He hired her as an escort from Craigslist on the night of her disappearance. Brewer said that shortly after Gilbert arrived at his residence she began acting erratically and fled his home. Gilbert was reportedly seen running through Oak Beach pounding on the doors of homes in Brewer's neighborhood. Around this time Gilbert called 9-1-1 saying that "they were trying to kill her." Police however did not find any evidence of wrongdoing and Brewer was quickly cleared as a suspect. It is important to note that Gilbert is not a confirmed victim.

James Burke 
Former Suffolk County Police Chief James Burke was reported to have blocked an FBI probe of the LISK case during his time as police chief. In November 2016 Burke was sentenced to 46 months in federal prison for assault and conspiracy. Burke violently assaulted a man in custody who had stolen a duffel bag from his police vehicle. The duffel bag contained sex toys, a pornographic DVD, snuff, and Viagra. Burke pleaded guilty in February 2016 to charges of a civil rights violation and conspiracy to obstruct justice. Thomas Spota, the then-district attorney in Suffolk County, was convicted in December 2019 of conspiracy to cover up Burke's violent assault. Christopher McPartland, who had been Suffolk County’s top anticorruption prosecutor, was also convicted in the conspiracy.

In December 2016 an attorney for Shannan Gilbert's family reported that an escort had stated that she suspected that Burke might be connected to the LISK cases. The escort, who identified herself as "Leanne," stated that at one party she had attended in April 2011 in Oak Beach she had seen Burke drag a woman of Asian appearance by the hair to the ground. Leanne said that when she saw Burke at a later party in August 2011 she decided to engage in sexual activity with him. She described an experience in which Burke violently yanked her head during oral sex to the point where she began to tear up. Burke was unable to reach orgasm and proceeded to throw $300–$400 at her afterwards. At the time she was not a professional prostitute and she states that this was the first time she was paid for sex.

Peter Hackett 
Two days after Gilbert's disappearance, Peter Hackett, a neighbor of Joseph Brewer who was a former physician and who had worked for Suffolk County as a police surgeon, phoned Shannan Gilbert's mother, Mari Gilbert. Mari Gilbert later recounted that Hackett said that he was taking care of Shannan, that he "ran a home for wayward girls," and that he had given her medication because she was distressed. Three days later Hackett called Mari Gilbert again denying that he had had any contact with her daughter and that he had previously phoned her.

Investigators later confirmed through phone records that Hackett had indeed called Mari Gilbert twice following her daughter's disappearance. The marshy area where Gilbert's remains were found was near Hackett's backyard and her personal items and clothing were found directly behind his property in the marsh. Gilbert's family filed a wrongful death suit against Hackett in November 2012 claiming that he took Gilbert into his home that morning and administered drugs to her, facilitating her death. The lawsuit was dismissed because it could not be proven that Hackett had administered drugs or treatment to Gilbert.

Later police revealed that Hackett had a history of inserting himself into, or exaggerating his role in, certain major events. Police later ruled out Hackett as a suspect in the deaths of Gilbert and the LISK victims. Hackett left Oak Beach and moved to Florida with his family not long after Gilbert's disappearance.

James Bissett 
Two days after Shannan Gilbert's remains were found businessman James Bissett died by suicide in his car at Mattituck park. One of Bissett's businesses was a plant nursery which was the main supplier of burlap in the region. Many of the victims' remains were found wrapped in burlap.

In popular culture
Numerous films, television programs, and podcasts have covered the case. These include:
 48 Hours: "Long Island Serial Killer" (1-hr documentary airdate July 12, 2011)
 The Long Island Serial Killer (2013), also known as The Gilgo Beach Murders, an independent feature directed by Joseph DiPietro
 People Magazine Investigates: "The Long Island Serial Killer: The Lost Girls" (2016): season 1, episodes 1–2
 The Killing Season (American TV series): "The Most Dangerous Game" (airdate November 12, 2016): season 1, episode 2
 Crime Junkie, episode 21: "SERIAL KILLER: L.I.S.K" (Released: April 16, 2018)
 Lost Girls, Netflix film (2020)
60 Minutes Australia: "Who is the Long Island serial killer?" (2020)
 The Long Island Serial Killer: A Mother's Hunt for Justice, Lifetime television film (2021)
The Criminal Lawyer  by Thomas Benigno
Grim Tide, (2021) a five part series on Fox Nation.
Unraveled: The Long Island Serial Killer (2021), a seven-part podcast series released by Investigation Discovery.

See also
Internet homicide
Cleveland Torso Murderer
List of fugitives from justice who disappeared
List of serial killers in the United States

References

Further reading

 
 
 
 Kolker, Robert. Lost Girls. (Harper Perennial, 2011)

External links

American murderers of children
American serial killers
Crime in the New York metropolitan area
Crimes against sex workers in the United States
Crimes in New York (state)
Crimes on Long Island, New York
Deaths by strangulation in the United States
Murder in New York (state)
Unidentified murder victims in New York (state)
Unidentified American serial killers
Unsolved murders in the United States
History of women in New York (state)